Junction Boulevard, originally Junction Avenue, is a two-mile north-south route that runs through the neighborhoods of Jackson Heights, Corona, Elmhurst, and Rego Park in Queens, New York City. It continues as 94th Street in East Elmhurst and also serves LaGuardia Airport.

Route description
94th Street begins at LaGuardia Airport, running south through the East Elmhurst neighborhood. Upon intersecting 32nd Avenue, it continues as Junction Boulevard. Along its route, it intersects with the following major roads: Grand Central Parkway, Astoria Boulevard, Roosevelt Avenue, Corona Avenue, Long Island Expressway, with its southern end at Queens Boulevard. Junction Boulevard passes by the LeFrak City apartment development and the Rego Center Mall, ending at Queens Boulevard. For most of its length, its width varies from two to four lanes.

Transportation
The entire length of 94th Street and Junction Boulevard is followed by the Q72 bus. Junction Boulevard contains two New York City Subway stations:

 Junction Boulevard station on the IRT Flushing Line
 63rd Drive–Rego Park station on the IND Queens Boulevard Line

References

Streets in Queens, New York
Corona, Queens
Elmhurst, Queens
Jackson Heights, Queens
East Elmhurst, Queens